Clark Botanic Garden is a  botanical garden and park located in Roslyn Heights, in Nassau County, on Long Island, in New York, United States.

Description 
The garden, designed by noted garden designer Alice Recknagel Ireys, was established in 1969 on the former estate of Grenville Clark, a noted attorney, author, and advisor to President Franklin Delano Roosevelt. In 1966, Clark donated his home to the Brooklyn Botanic Garden. The site now contains approximately 5,000 species of plants, with over 1,000 labeled trees, shrubs, and garden plants arranged in 12 specialty gardens. Collections include native wildflowers, conifers, roses, perennials, daylilies, wetland plants, rock garden plants, herbs, butterfly plants, and medicinal plants.

There are two ponds and a small gift shop on the grounds, as well as a community gardening area. The garden is now owned by the Town of North Hempstead and operated by a non-profit organization. It is open to the public with no admission charge. Occasionally concerts or other special events are held on the grounds. During the summer months free compost is sometimes available to local residents.

Location 
Although the Clark Botanic Garden uses an Albertson mailing address, it is located within the boundaries of the adjacent hamlet, Roslyn Heights.

See also 
 List of botanical gardens in the United States

References

External links 
 
 Town of North Hempstead - Clark Botanic Garden

Botanical gardens in New York (state)
Town of North Hempstead, New York
Protected areas of Nassau County, New York